Strap-on can refer to:

 Strap-on booster, a rocket motor which is used and then discarded
 Strap-on dildo, a sex toy
 Strap-on keyboard or "keytar", a keyboard instrument or MIDI controller that can be worn on a strap like a guitar
 Vortech Meg-2XH Strap-On, an American foot-launched helicopter design
 Strap, a term used to describe a gun